The University of Pennsylvania School of Arts and Sciences (also known as SAS) is the academic institution encompassing the humanities, social sciences, and natural sciences at the University of Pennsylvania.

Formerly known as the Faculty of Arts and Sciences, SAS is an umbrella organization that is divided into three main academic components: The College of Arts & Sciences (CAS) is Penn's undergraduate liberal arts school. The Graduate Division offers post-undergraduate M.A., M.S., and Ph.D. programs. Finally, the College of Liberal and Professional Studies (LPS), originally called "College of General Studies", is Penn's continuing and professional education division, catered to working professionals.

History
The 1755 charter of Benjamin Franklin's College of Philadelphia paved the way to form the College of Arts and Sciences, which was originally for men only. In 1933, Penn established the College of Liberal Arts for Women, which was meant to provide women with a formal liberal arts education to women rather than one designed specifically for teachers. Female education remained formally separate until 1974 when it merged with CAS, LPS, and four social science departments in the Wharton School to form the Faculty of Arts and Sciences. This was renamed the School of Arts and Sciences two years later.

The Graduate Division's origins date back to 1882 when Penn first appointed faculty to form a philosophy department. Penn first began offering courses for teachers in 1892, paving way for the eventual founding of the LPS school, which was originally called the College of General Studies.

Structure 
The School of Arts and Sciences contains the following departments:

 Africana Studies
 Anthropology
 Biology
 Chemistry
 Classical Studies
 Criminology
 Earth and Environmental Science
 East Asian Languages & Civilizations
 Economics
 English
 Germanic Languages and Literatures
 History
 History and Sociology of Science
 History of Art
 Linguistics
 Mathematics
 Music
 Near Eastern Languages & Civilizations
 Philosophy
 Physics and Astronomy
 Political Science
 Psychology
 Religious Studies
 Romance Languages
 Russian and East European Studies
 Sociology
 South Asia Studies

Research
Research at SAS is funded by the Center for Undergraduate Research and Fellowships (CURF), as well as the University Research Foundation.

See also
Henry Lamar Crosby
Herman Vandenburg Ames
University of Pennsylvania Economics Department

References

External links
Official Site
The College of Arts and Sciences

University of Pennsylvania schools
1755 establishments in Pennsylvania
Liberal arts colleges at universities in the United States